Christ Junior-Ray Eneme Bekale (born 20 March 1999) is a Gabonese professional footballer who plays as a midfielder for Moldovan Super Liga club Sheriff Tiraspol.

Career
On 8 February 2023, Sheriff Tiraspol announced the signing of Bekale.

National Team 
In March, he is summoned for the first by Patrice Neveu in his list of 23 players to play in the CAN 2023 qualifiers for the double confrontation against Sudan.

Career statistics

Club

References

External links

1999 births
Living people
Sportspeople from Libreville
Gabonese footballers
Association football midfielders
ES Métlaoui players
CA Bizertin players
US Tataouine players
EO Sidi Bouzid players
Tunisian Ligue Professionnelle 1 players
Gabon under-20 international footballers
Gabonese expatriate footballers
Gabonese expatriate sportspeople in Tunisia
Expatriate footballers in Tunisia
Gabonese expatriate sportspeople in Libya
Expatriate footballers in Libya
Gabonese people of Equatoguinean descent
Sportspeople of Equatoguinean descent
21st-century Gabonese people